Muhammad Ghawth (Ghouse, Ghaus or Gwath) Gwaliyari (1500–1562) was a 16th-century Sufi master of the Shattari order and Sufi saint, a musician, and the author of Jawahir-i Khams (Arabic: al-Jawahir al-Khams, The Five Jewels). The book mentioning the life and miracles of Gaus named " Heaven's witness" was written by Kugle.

Biography 

Muhammad Ghawth was born in Gwalior, India in 1500; the name Gwaliyari means "of Gwalior". One of his ancestors was Fariduddin Attar of Nishapur. In the preface of al-Jawahir al-Khams, he states that he wrote the book when he was 25 years old. In 1549 he travelled to Gujarat, when he was 50 years old. He stayed in Ahmedabad for ten years where he founded Ek Toda Mosque and preached.

Ghawth translated the Amrtakunda from Sanskrit to Persian as the Bahr al-Hayat (The Ocean of Life), introducing to Sufism a set of yoga practices. According to the scholar Carl W. Ernst, in this "translation", Ghawth intentionally reframed these practices with great subtlety to identify "points of contact between the terminologies of Yoga and Sufism".

Ghawth died in Gwalior in 1562. His followers believed that he ascended to heaven and from there was able to direct help down to them; and further, that he was the "axial saint, the pivot of the universe".

"Among Ghawth's disciples is Fazl Allah Shattari (also known as Shah Fazl Shattari), who wrote a biography or monograph in praise of his teacher. Gwawth taught the Mughal Emperor Humayun.  Akbar's court musician Tansen was also familiar with Sufism.
Badusha, Abdul Qadir, Shahul Hamid Meeran sahib Ganjasavoy Ganja bakhsh Ganja makhfi of nagore Tamil Nadu and Wajihudden Haidar Ali Sani Hussaini Ulvi Gujrati is also one his important disciple. 
Muhammad Ghawth died in 1562 CE. Ghawth's tomb, in Gwalior (a city in Madhya Pradesh in India), which was built in his honour by Akbar, is a well-known tourist attraction and regarded as an excellent example of Mughal Architecture. Tansen was buried in Ghawth's tomb complex."

Tomb at Gwalior 

His tomb at Gwalior is famous of its stone lattices (jali) work. The entire  structure is
enclosed on all sides by the elaborately and delicately carved stone lattice work.

Sufi saeed Ali Shah was the former caretaker of the shrine.

Works 

 Jawahir-i-Khamsa (The Five Jewels) which was later translated to Arabic, al-Jawahir al-Khams, by the Mecca-based Shattari teacher Sibghat Allah (d. 1606 CE). In this book Gaus also mentioned about the special creatures known as "Muakkil" which comes under the control of sufis by special Islam chant.
 Bahr al-Hayat (The Ocean of Life), his translation and extension of Hawd al-Hayat (The Pool of Life), an Arabic translation of a lost Sanskrit text on yoga, the Amrtakunda.

References

External links
 Silsila e Shuttariya

Indian Sufi saints
Sufi writers
1562 deaths
Year of birth unknown
People from Gwalior
1500 births